Data Mining Extensions (DMX) is a query language for data mining models supported by Microsoft's SQL Server Analysis Services product.

Like SQL, it supports a data definition language, data manipulation language and a data query language, all three with SQL-like syntax.
Whereas SQL statements operate on relational tables, DMX statements operate on data mining models.
Similarly, SQL Server supports the MDX language for OLAP databases.
DMX is used to create and train data mining models, and to browse, manage, and predict against them.
DMX is composed of data definition language (DDL) statements, data manipulation language (DML) statements, and functions and operators.

Queries 
DMX Queries are formulated using the SELECT statement.
They can extract information from existing data mining models in various ways.

Data definition language 
The data definition language (DDL) part of DMX can be used to
 Create new data mining models and mining structures - CREATE MINING STRUCTURE, CREATE MINING MODEL
 Delete existing data mining models and mining structures - DROP MINING STRUCTURE, DROP MINING MODEL
 Export and import mining structures - EXPORT, IMPORT
 Copy data from one mining model to another - SELECT INTO

Data manipulation language 
The data manipulation language (DML) part of DMX can be used to
 Train mining models - INSERT INTO
 Browse data in mining models - SELECT FROM
 Make predictions using mining model - SELECT ... FROM PREDICTION JOIN

Example: a prediction query 
This example is a singleton prediction query, which predicts for the given customer whether she will be interested in home loan products.
SELECT
  [Loan Seeker],
  PredictProbability([Loan Seeker])
FROM
  [Decision Tree]
NATURAL PREDICTION JOIN
(SELECT
   35 AS [Age],
   'Y' AS [House Owner],
   'M' AS [Marital Status],
   'F' AS [Gender],
   2 AS [Number Cars Owned],
   2 AS [Total Children],
   18 AS [Total Years of Education]
)

See also 
XML for Analysis

References

External links 
Data Mining Extensions (DMX) Reference, (at MSDN)

Query languages
Data mining and machine learning software